The Holitna River (Deg Xinag: Xaletno, Yup'ik: Rruulitnaq) is a  tributary of the Kuskokwim River in the U.S. state of Alaska. Formed by the confluence of Shotgun Creek and the Kogrukluk River east of the Kuskokwim Mountains, the river flows generally northeast to meet the larger river near Sleetmute.

Operation Holitna, a federal investigation into child pornography, was named after the river. The Holitna River has many tributaries, serving as a metaphor for the fact that each time the investigation makes an arrest, several new victims and leads are discovered.

See also
List of rivers of Alaska

References

External links
Holitna River Watershed - 19030404 Surf Your Watershed – U.S. Environmental Protection Agency

Rivers of Bethel Census Area, Alaska
Rivers of Dillingham Census Area, Alaska
Rivers of Alaska
Rivers of Unorganized Borough, Alaska